Aguachile (“chile water” in Spanish) is a Mexican dish made of shrimp, submerged in liquid seasoned with chiltepin peppers, lime juice, salt, slices of cucumber and slices of onion. Raw vegetables such as cucumber are usually added. This raw seafood dish comes from the north west region of Mexico (mainly Sinaloa), and is normally prepared in a molcajete. The origin of aguachile lies in the coast of Sinaloa, originally made with boiled water and chiltepines, small round chili peppers from Sinaloa.

External links

Mexican cuisine
Seafood